The American Institute of Steel Construction (AISC)  is a not-for-profit technical institute and trade association for the use of structural steel in the construction industry of the United States. It was founded in 1921 and is headquartered in Chicago, Illinois.

AISC publishes the Steel Construction Manual, an authoritative volume on steel building structure design that is referenced in all U.S. building codes.

The organization works with government agencies, policymakers, and other stakeholders to promote policies and regulations that support the industry's growth and development.

References

American engineering organizations